Fate of the Animals is a painting by Franz Marc created in 1913. It is oil on canvas. This work contrasts most of Marc's other works by presenting animals in a brutal way rather than depicting them in a peaceful manner. Marc's strong ties with animals as his subjects remains uncertain, but it is predicted to stem from his childhood dog. Fate of the Animals remains one of Marc's most famous pieces and displays Der Blaue Reiter style that he co-founded with Wassily Kandinsky. The painting currently resides in the Kunstmuseum in Basel, Switzerland.

The last third of the painting was damaged in a warehouse fire in 1916 after Marc's death and was later restored by one of his close friends, Paul Klee. Klee restored the painting using old photographs. He added a brownish tint to the paint creating an obvious variation from the rest of the painting. Scholars have yet to figure out his decision to paint with a brown tint. Many opinions on the subject have been given, although none have been proven.

Title and subject
The title of the work is known as Fate of the Animals in English. This stems from the German name Tierschicksale which figuratively translates to animal destinies. Paul Klee is believed to have suggested this title. In a letter to Auguste Macke, Marc referred to the picture with a longer title: The trees show their rings, the animals their veins. This is from the evident tree rings present as well as the green horse on the right whose veins are visible on its body. On the back of the canvas is an inscription which translates to "And all being is flaming, suffering" or "And all being is flaming sorrow."

Fate of the Animals'''s title derives from the chaotic scene depicted. There are animals scattered throughout the canvas in what is referred to as a post apocalyptic setting. The scene depicts a forest that is being destroyed by the flames that are evident all around. The painting consists of a blue deer in the middle of the canvas, two boars on the left side, two horses above the boars, and four unidentified figures on the right. The four unidentified animals are believed to be either deer, foxes, or wolves. Most scholars believe that the animals are deer based on Marc's older works where he depicts them with the same colors and physical attributes.

It is a premonition to World War I that Marc experienced living in Germany. The brutality of the animals lives at the depicted moment reflected what the oncoming war would be doing to the people of the world. The destruction, the chaos, and the sadness that the viewer sees sums up the evident outcome the future war would bring.

Techniques
The painting contains only diagonal lines. The lack of horizontal and vertical lines throughout the painting along with the deep colors, create tension. This tension further highlights the chaos and violence of the animal's lives. These diagonals are emphasized in three primary ways: composition order, diagonal posture of the animals, and “the animal’s position in conformity with the diagonals." The diagonals also help with the narration by acting as fire sparks scattering across the canvas.

Marc's paintings had a reoccurring theme of colors that represented certain things. Blue would represent males and the severity and spirituality that they held. Yellow would depict females and their sensual and gentle side. Red would represent matter and the heaviness and brutality it held. Franz Marc makes use of these colors in Fate of the Animals to further his ongoing theme of colors. The blue deer in the middle is a male that holds a lot of spirituality. Some scholars believe that the blue deer is seen as a sacrifice, whose color and up-looking posture further prove.

Narration
A forest fire is shown with many animals in the chaos. The scene starts at the top left corner where there are three main sparks present. These sparks of fire are coming from an unknown source and will begin to ignite more of the fire and most of the animals. Under the horse there are many diagonals painted red. This is the first of the sparks to ignite the ground under the horses. The horse on the left has a face of agony and is crying out. The horse on the right is more accepting of his fate of oncoming death and looks away from the fire.

The next spark to hit is the tan line that is right across the blue deers neck. It misses the blue deer and heads towards the boars in the bottom left of the painting. The boars are accepting their evident death from the flame. The boars are turned away from the flame coming straight towards them and they both have a sad face.

The last main spark to hit is the larger red diagonal that is behind the blue deer. Again this spark misses the deer and lands to ignite the ground behind him. The main large diagonals going across the canvas from the top middle to the bottom right is a tree. This tree is falling on the deer and his dramatic posture with his head up. It is another acceptance of fate for the animals.

The four animals on the right are the only animals that are completely safe from any harm. There are no sparks heading towards them and no trees about to fall on them. There is no certainty as to why these animals were chosen as the only beings safe from the harm of the destructive forest.

Marc's depiction of animals
Along with Marc's reoccurring themes of colors, he would also depict animals in the same manners. Deer were sacred animals to Marc. He usually painted them, like most of his animals, in a very peaceful manner. His works such as Grazing Horses IV (The Red Horses), The Yellow Cow, and Dog Lying in Snow depict animals in a peaceful setting. Fate of the Animals'' provides a contrast to his normal depiction of animals, in which he puts his beloved animals in a scene of destruction.

The only animal to not remain consistent throughout Marc's works was horses. They ranged anywhere from sacred, aspiring, to human-like and everywhere in between. This could explain why the only animal that shows its veins is one of the horses.

See also
List of works by Franz Marc

Notes

External links

 

1913 paintings
Mammals in art
Deer in art
Paintings by Franz Marc
Horses in art
Pigs in art